The Dr. Hovey Everett House is a Greek Revival style house in the hamlet of Lowman in the town of Chemung, New York.  It is significant both for its architecture and for its association with the life of Dr. Hovey Everett, who practised medicine in the area including Lowman and nearby Elmira, New York for forty years, from his arrival in the area in 1821 until his death in 1861.  The house was built in 1827 as a wedding present for Dr. Everett upon his marriage to Cynthia Lowman, of the family for whom the town was named.  The house and related buildings and structures were added to the National Register of Historic Places in 2007.

Gallery

References

Houses on the National Register of Historic Places in New York (state)
Houses completed in 1827
Houses in Chemung County, New York
1827 establishments in New York (state)
National Register of Historic Places in Chemung County, New York